Syagrus coronata, commonly known as the ouricury palm, aricuri palm, or licuri palm, is a species of palm tree that is native to eastern Brazil, ranging from the southern part of the state of Pernambuco, into the state of Bahia, south to the Jequitinhonha River in the state of Minas Gerais. The tree can live for 30-150 years, though most only live for 8-10 years on average. It plays an important role in the diets of tropical seasonally dry forest animals.

Description
The blooms are bright yellow, and the plants bear fruit for most of the year.

Ecological importance

Licuri palm nuts are the main food source of Lear's macaw, making up around 95% of their diet. These nuts can grow to be one inch (2.5 cm) in width.

Threats
The destruction of small seedlings by cattle poses a threat to the plants, primarily through the destruction of concentrated groves. Those groves are vital to Lear's macaw.

Uses
Syagrus coronata is the source of ouricury wax.

References

External links
 Photos

coronata
Endemic flora of Brazil
Plants described in 1826
Taxa named by Odoardo Beccari